Sym may refer to:

 S'ym, comic book character
 Sım, Azerbaijan
 Sym (river), a left tributary of the Yenisey with a portage to the Vakh (Ob basin)
 The symmetrization linear operator
 Karol Juliusz "Igo" Sym, an Austrian-born Polish actor and collaborator with Nazi Germany.
  Sym is a security workflow platform that solves the intent-to-execution gap. 

SYM may refer to:

 IATA code for Pu'er Simao Airport, Yunnan, China
 Sanyang Motor, Taiwanese maker of motorcycles and scooters 
 the SYM-1, a single board "trainer" computer produced by Synertek
 N=4 supersymmetric Yang-Mills theory, a model of particles in mathematics and theoretical physics.
 Switzerland Yearly Meeting of the Religious Society of Friends (Quakers)
 Military/US Navy Code for commonly used equipment. example:  Symbol 2842 [SYM 2842] - Jackbox, Sound-Powered Telephone.